The 2nd New York Heavy Artillery Regiment was a heavy artillery regiment that served in the Union Army during the American Civil War. During the Siege of Petersburg the regiment operated as infantry.

Service
The regiment was organized at Staten Island, New York and mustered in by individual batteries beginning August 23, 1861, for three years service.

Battery A – mustered in October 2, 1861
Battery B – mustered in August 23, 1861
Battery C – mustered in September 18, 1861
Battery D – mustered in September 18, 1861
Battery E – mustered in October 2, 1861
Battery F – mustered in October 15, 1861
Battery G – mustered in October 15, 1861
Battery H – mustered in October 15, 1861
Battery I – mustered in December 12, 1861
Battery K – mustered in December 12, 1861
Battery L – mustered in November 18, 1861
Battery M – mustered in December 12, 1861

On June 27, 1865, the regiment was consolidated into eight batteries. The men of Battery I were transferred to Batteries A & E. The men of Battery K were transferred to Batteries A, C, and F. The men of Battery L were transferred to Batteries B, C, D, and H. And the men of Battery M were transferred to Batteries A, G, and H.

The regiment was attached to Military District of Washington, D.C., December 1861 to May 1862. Sturgis' Command, Military District of Washington, to January 1863. Artillery, District of Alexandria, Virginia, to February 1863. Artillery, District of Alexandria, XXII Corps, Department of Washington, to April 1863. 1st Brigade, DeRussy's Division, XXII Corps, to April 1864. 2nd Brigade, DeRussy's Division, XXII Corps, to May 1864. Tyler's Heavy Artillery Division, II Corps, Army of the Potomac, May 16–29, 1864. 1st Brigade, 1st Division, II Corps, to June 1865. 1st Brigade, DeRussy's Division, XXII Corps, to September 1865.

The 2nd New York Heavy Artillery mustered out of the service at Washington, D.C. on September 29, 1865.

Detailed service
Eight batteries left New York for Washington, D.C., November 7, 1861. Battery L left December 2 and Batteries I, K, and M left December 12, 1861. Duty in the Defenses of Washington until May 1864. Pope's Campaign in northern Virginia August 1862. Action at Bull Run Bridge, Va., August 27. Battle of Bull Run, Va., August 29–30. Ordered to join Army of the Potomac in the field May 15, 1864. Rapidan Campaign May–June. Spotsylvania Court House, Va., May 18–21. Harris Farm or Fredericksburg Road May 19. North Anna River May 23–26. On line of the Pamunkey May 26–28. Totopotomoy May 28–31. Cold Harbor June 1–12. Assault at Cold Harbor June 3. Before Petersburg June 16–18. Siege of Petersburg June 16, 1864, to April 2, 1865. Jerusalem Plank Road June 22–23, 1864. Deep Bottom July 27–28. Mine Explosion at Petersburg, July 30 (reserve). Deep Bottom, August 14–18. Ream's Station August 25. Boydton Plank Road, October 27–28. Reconnaissance to Hatcher's Run December 9–10. Hatcher's Run December 9. Dabney's Mills, Hatcher's Run, February 5–7, 1865. Watkins' House March 25. Appomattox Campaign March 28 – April 9. On line of Hatcher's and Gravelly Runs March 29–30. Hatcher's Run or Boydton Road March 31. White Oak Road March 31. Sutherland Station and fall of Petersburg April 2. Amelia Springs April 5. Sailor's Creek April 6. High Bridge and Farmville April 7. Appomattox Court House April 9. Surrender of Lee and his army. March to Washington, D.C., May 2–12. Grand Review of the Armies May 23. Duty at Washington, D.C. until September.

Casualties
The regiment lost as a total of 461 men during service; 10 officers and 204 enlisted men killed or mortally wounded, 204 enlisted men died of disease.

Commanders
 Colonel Joseph N. G. Whistler
 Colonel Milton Cogswell

Notable members
 Private Thomas Davis, Company C - Medal of Honor recipient for action at the Battle of Sailor's Creek
 Sergeant Adam Worth, Company L - infamous criminal

See also

 List of New York Civil War regiments
 New York in the American Civil War

Notes

References
 Dyer, Frederick Henry. A Compendium of the War of the Rebellion (Des Moines, IA:  Dyer Pub. Co.), 1908.
 Phisterer, Frederick. New York in the War of the Rebellion (Albany, NY: J. B. Lyon Company), 1912.
Attribution

External links
 National flag attributed to the 2nd New York Heavy Artillery
 Guidon of Battery L

Military units and formations established in 1861
Military units and formations disestablished in 1865
Artillery 002
1861 establishments in New York (state)
Artillery units and formations of the American Civil War